Derek Santos Olson is an American television writer. He has worked on the NBC drama Friday Night Lights and has been nominated for a Writers Guild of America (WGA) Award.

Biography
He began writing for television on the fourth season of Friday Night Lights in 2009. He wrote the episode "The Toilet Bowl". He was nominated for the Writers Guild of America (WGA) Award for Best Drama Series at the February 2010 ceremony for his work on the fourth season.

External links

References

American male screenwriters
American television writers
Living people
Year of birth missing (living people)
American male television writers